The Carangidae are a family of ray-finned fish that includes the jacks, pompanos, jack mackerels, runners, trevallies, and scads. It is the largest of the six families included within the order Carangiformes. Some authorities classify it as the only family within that order but molecular and anatomical studies indicate that there is a close relationship between this family and the five former Perciform families which make up the Carangiformes.

They are marine fishes found in the Atlantic, Indian and Pacific Oceans. Most species are fast-swimming predatory fishes that hunt in the waters above reefs and in the open sea; some dig in the sea floor for invertebrates.

The largest fish in the family, the greater amberjack, Seriola dumerili, grows up to 2 m in length; most fish in the family reach a maximum length of 25–100 cm.

The family contains many important commercial and game fish, notably the Pacific jack mackerel, Trachurus symmetricus, and the other jack mackerels in the genus Trachurus.

Many genera have fairly extensive fossil records, particularly Caranx and Seriola, which extend into the early Paleogene (late Thanetian), and are known from whole and incomplete specimens, skeletal fragments, and otoliths.  The several extinct genera include Archaeus, Pseudovomer, and Eastmanalepes.

Subfamilies and genera
The family Carangidae is subdivided into the following subfamilies and genera:

 Subfamily Trachinotinae Gill, 1861
 Genus Lichia Cuvier, 1816
 Genus Trachinotus Lacepède, 1801
 Subfamily Scomberoidinae Gill, 1890
 Genus Oligoplites Gill, 1863
 Genus Parona C. Berg, 1895
 Genus Scomberoides Lacepède, 1801
 Subfamily Naucratinae Bleeker, 1859
 Genus Campogramma Regan, 1903
 Genus Elagatis F.D. Bennett, 1840
 Genus Naucrates Rafinesque, 1810
 Genus Seriola Bleeker, 1854
 Genus Seriolina Wakiya, 1924
 Subfamily Caranginae Rafinesque, 1815
 Genus Alectis Rafinesque, 1815
 Genus Alepes Swainson, 1839
 Genus Atropus Oken, 1817
 Genus Atule D.S. Jordan & E.K. Jordan, 1922
 Genus Carangoides Bleeker, 1851
 Genus Caranx Lacepède, 1801
 Genus Chloroscombrus Girard, 1858
 Genus Decapterus Bleeker, 1851
 Genus Gnathodon Bleeker, 1850
 Genus Hemicaranx Bleeker, 1862
 Genus Megalaspis Bleeker, 1851
 Genus Pantolabus Whitley, 1931
 Genus Parastromateus Bleeker, 1864
 Genus Pseudocaranx Bleeker, 1863
 Genus Selar Bleeker, 1851
 Genus Selaroides Bleeker, 1851
 Genus Selene Lacepède, 1802
 Genus Trachurus Rafinesque, 1810
 Genus Ulua D.S. Jordan & Snyder, 1908
 Genus Uraspis Bleeker, 1855

See also
There are a great many fish called trevallies, most of which belong to the Carangidae. For articles on them, see .

References 

 
Carangiformes
Marine fish families
Taxa named by Constantine Samuel Rafinesque